Lawrence Lemieux (born November 12, 1955 in Edmonton, Alberta) is a Canadian sailor, who competed at the 1984 Summer Olympics in the Star class and at the 1988 Summer Olympics in the Finn class. He is famous for his actions in the latter competition, which resulted in him being awarded the Pierre de Coubertin medal.

Biography
Lemieux grew up sailing on Wabamun Lake west of Edmonton with his five older brothers. He began racing solo boats in the 1970s.

1988 Olympic rescue
On September 24, 1988, the sailing competition was underway at Busan, 450 kilometers from South Korea's capital of Seoul, the main Olympic site. At the time, the 470 and Finn classes were running races on their respective courses. The wind suddenly picked up, blowing 35 knots, and the Singapore team's dinghy with Joseph Chan and Siew Shaw Her aboard capsized. The men were thrown from the boat as it tipped over and were injured, in need of assistance. At this time, Lemieux was running the fifth of the seven total races to determine the medalists in the Finn class and was in second place in that race. Near the halfway point of his race, Lemieux spotted the Singapore shipwreck and deviated from his course to assist in rescuing Chan and Siew. After pulling them from the water, Lemieux waited for a patrol boat to take the rescued sailors back to shore. Once that happened, he rejoined the Finn heat, coming in twenty-second place. However, due to his actions, the International Yacht Racing Union decided to reinstate Lemieux's position when he went off course, rewarding him with a second-place finish in his race.

Despite this, Lemieux went on to place eleventh in the class. At the medal awards ceremony, Juan Antonio Samaranch, President of the International Olympic Committee, awarded Lemieux the Pierre de Coubertin medal for sportsmanship. "By your sportsmanship, self-sacrifice and courage," said Samaranch, "you embody all that is right with the Olympic ideal." Lemieux, at the time, was only the fifth recipient of the de Coubertin Medal, and the second to receive it during a Games in which he was a competitor, following Eugenio Monti.

Post-retirement
Lemieux has since retired from professional sailing and is now a coach. He is currently living at Seba Beach, Alberta. Asked in a 2012 interview if he would rather be talking about the medal he might have won instead of the rescue, Lemieux referred to sailing's lack of a high media profile: "You spend your life working really hard internationally and you get very few accolades. So that's the ironic thing; 25 years after this rescue, we're still talking about it."

References

External links 

1988 recap on CBC
Lemieux's sportsmanship still recognized

1955 births
Living people
Franco-Albertan people
Olympic sailors of Canada
Canadian male sailors (sport)
Recipients of the Pierre de Coubertin medal
Sailors at the 1984 Summer Olympics – Star
Sailors at the 1988 Summer Olympics – Finn
Sailors at the 1991 Pan American Games
Sportspeople from Edmonton
Pan American Games medalists in sailing
Pan American Games gold medalists for Canada
Medalists at the 1991 Pan American Games